Petros Kravaritis (born 31 August 1987) is a Greek goalkeeper. He currently plays for Fostiras.

Kravaritis was part of Panathinaikos' youth team before signing on with the professional team in 2006. He didn't make an appearance that season and the club loaned him to Koropi for two years not long after. From 2009—2010, he was signed with Thrasyvoulos; 2010—2011, Rodos; 2012—2013, Kordelio; and 2013—2014, Anagennisi Giannitsa and Ermionida. He played for Serres from 2014—2015 and P.S. «I Sparti» from 2015 to 2017. He goaltended for Apollon Larissa for a reason before returning to Sparta for the 2018—2019 season. He them moved onto Ypato and AE Moschatou for a year each. He currently has a one-year contract with Fostiras for the 2021—2022 season. He also played a few games for Panionios in 2021.

References

1987 births
Living people
Panathinaikos F.C. players
Greek footballers
Thrasyvoulos F.C. players
Association football goalkeepers
Footballers from Lamia (city)